Coldspring is a city in San Jacinto County, Texas, United States. It is the county seat of San Jacinto County which is named after the river that traverses it and shares its name with the battle which gave Texas its independence. The population was 819 at the 2020 census.

History
The history of Coldspring is linked to Stephen F. Austin's first colony in Texas, which established, among other locales, San Jacinto County.  Austin's original colony extended to the Trinity River watershed, roughly along Texas 156, toward Point Blank.  After receiving a commission from the Mexican government to settle the town, Joseph Vehlein, a German immigrant to Mexico, deeded  to Robert Rankin, an American Revolutionary officer.  This acreage included the site of Coldspring.

The settlement of Cold Springs (old spelling) began around 1850.  In 1848, there existed only a trading post called "Coonskin", later "Fireman's Hill" nearby.

Coldspring had developed into a bustling county seat town by 1915, but disaster struck March 30, 1915, when the wooden courthouse burned, thus removing the economic foundation of the town.  Plans for the present courthouse were made, and the building was completed in 1918.  Thereafter, the townspeople moved their buildings near the new courthouse at its present location. In 1983, San Jacinto County sheriff, James Cecil "Humpy" Parker, was arrested for, charged
with, and convicted of six civil rights abuses of suspects using the form of torture called waterboarding and was sentenced to 10 years in federal prison but served less than five before his medical release due to brain cancer; he died in 1994. Parker's son and deputy, Gary, was convicted in 1984 of conspiracy to violate suspects' rights. These incidents were incorporated into a novel by Steven Sellers,
Terror on Highway 59 in 1984, which in turn was made into a made-for-television movie, Terror on Highway 91 (1989), starring 
Ricky Schroder.

Geography

Coldspring is located at  (30.588194, –95.133262).

Demographics

As of the 2020 United States census, there were 819 people, 387 households, and 197 families residing in the city.

As of the census of 2000,  691 people, 263 households, and 180 families were living in the city. The population density was 375.2 people per square mile (145.0/km). The 313 housing units averaged 169.9 per square mile (65.7/km). The racial makeup of the city was 66.28% White, 31.40% African American, 0.43% Native American, 0.58% Asian, and 1.30% from two or more races. Hispanics or Latinos of any race were 3.18% of the population.

Of the 263 households, 34.6% had children under the age of 18 living with them, 44.1% were married couples living together, 20.5% had a female householder with no husband present, and 31.2% were not families. About 28.1% of all households were made up of individuals, and 12.5% had someone living alone who was 65 years of age or older. The average household size was 2.44, and the average family size was 2.91.

In the city, the population was distributed as 27.8% under the age of 18, 10.6% from 18 to 24, 26.8% from 25 to 44, 20.1% from 45 to 64, and 14.8% who were 65 years of age or older. The median age was 34 years. For every 100 females, there were 95.8 males. For every 100 females age 18 and over, there were 86.9 males.

The median income for a household in the city was $27,083, and the median income for a family was $30,729. Males had a median income of $31,667 versus $23,750 for females. The per capita income for the city was $16,777. About 19.7% of families and 19.6% of the population were below the poverty line, including 18.9% of those under age 18 and 13.6% of those age 65 or over.

Culture
About 25 golf courses are within a  radius of Coldspring.  Nearby, the Sam Houston National Forest, Lake Livingston, and Double Lake recreational area offer opportunities for camping, hiking, fishing, and water skiing. More than 35 historical markers are placed throughout the town.  Also of historical significance are the Historic Heritage Center, Old Town Coldspring, the 1887 Jail Museum, and the oldest continuously active United Methodist Church in Texas, which was established in 1848. The town's square hosts antique stores, art studios, and restaurants.

Education
The City of Coldspring is served by the Coldspring-Oakhurst Consolidated Independent School District.

References

Cities in Texas
Cities in San Jacinto County, Texas
County seats in Texas
Greater Houston